Laurel True (born 1968) American artist, architectural artist, muralist and mosaic artist. 

True, founder of one of the first formal mosaic institutes in the United States, Institute of Mosaic Art, was born in Ann Arbor, Michigan.  

True's career began in 1990 with an apprenticeship with outsider mosaic artist Isaiah Zagar working on site-specific architectural mosaics and evolved into one focused on large-scale public and community mosaic projects.  An instructor and lecturer in the US since the mid-1990s, True maintains an active studio practice and travels through her organization, The Global Mosaic Project, to work on public projects involving local communities.

She currently resides in Oakland, California.

References
 Reckdahl, Katy (July 19, 2016) New Orleans Community Works Together to Create Mosaic The New Orleans Advocate

External links
Laurel True's official website
Institute of Mosaic Art – founded by Laurel True

American artists
1968 births
Living people
Mosaic artists
Artists from Ann Arbor, Michigan